Joseph Fair is a virologist and former vice president and director of research and development for Metabiota, Inc. Since March 2020 he has been a science contributor for the American television network NBC.

Education
After briefly attending the University of Kentucky, Fair received his bachelor's degree in biology from Loyola University New Orleans, and his M.P.H. and Ph.D. in molecular biology from Tulane University.

Work
Fair is known for his work with hemorrhagic fevers notably Ebola and Lassa fever (LHF), as well as the tracking and biosurveillance of infectious diseases.

From April 2008 to April 2014, Fair was a corporate vice-president at Metabiota, Inc. (formerly Global Viral Forecasting, Inc.). He then worked as a consulting advisor to Fondation Mérieux.  From 2015 to 2017 he was a chief adviser in Global Health Surveillance & Diagnostics for MRIGlobal and a senior fellow in global health security at Pennsylvania State University.  In 2018 he worked with International Medical Corps.  Since January 2018 he has been a senior fellow at the Scowcroft Institute of International Affairs at the Bush School of Government and Public Service, Texas A&M University.

In 2020, Fair was hospitalized with flu-like symptoms and was initially believed by his doctors to have caught COVID-19. Later testing, however, revealed it was not COVID; the cause of his illness remains unknown.

References

External links
 Joseph Fair at IMDb

Living people
American epidemiologists
American virologists
Tulane University alumni
Year of birth missing (living people)
American television personalities
Male television personalities